Herman VIII, Margrave of Baden-Baden (died 1338) was a titular Margrave of Baden-Baden.  He was the son on Margrave Hesso and his first wife Clara, a daughter of Count Walter III of Klingen.

Herman VIII died in 1338.

Margraves of Baden-Baden
Year of birth unknown
1338 deaths
14th-century German nobility